Gary L. Lancaster (August 14, 1949 – April 24, 2013) was a United States district judge of the United States District Court for the Western District of Pennsylvania.

Early years
Born in Brownsville, Pennsylvania, Lancaster received a Bachelor of Science degree in secondary education from Slippery Rock State College in 1971 and a Juris Doctor from the University of Pittsburgh School of Law in 1974.

Early career
From 1974 to 1978, Lancaster served as Regional Counsel to the Pennsylvania Human Relations Commission as well as an Assistant District Attorney in Allegheny County. He entered private practice in Pittsburgh, Pennsylvania in 1978, where he focused mostly on criminal litigation.

Federal judicial service

United States magistrate judge service
In 1987, Lancaster was selected to serve as a United States magistrate judge for the United States District Court for the Western District of Pennsylvania.

United States district court service
He was nominated to be a district judge by President Bill Clinton on October 25, 1993, to the seat vacated by Timothy K. Lewis, who had been elevated to a newly created seat on the United States Court of Appeals for the Third Circuit. Lancaster was confirmed by the United States Senate on November 20, 1993, and received his commission the following day. 

While on the bench, Lancaster served on the committee responsible for drafting the Third Circuit's Model Civil Jury Instructions, and was also appointed by Chief Justice William H. Rehnquist to serve on the Judicial Conference of the United States Committee on Judicial Resources. He was also responsible for overseeing the renovation of the district's historic New Deal-era federal courthouse in downtown Pittsburgh.

In 2009, Lancaster became the first African-American to serve as Chief Judge of the United States District Court for the Western District of Pennsylvania, succeeding Donetta Ambrose. During his tenure as Chief Judge, Lancaster was instrumental in the court's involvement in the Patent Pilot Program, a national initiative designed to enhance the expertise of federal judges in patent litigation. As of 2013, the United States District Court for the Western District of Pennsylvania remains one of the few judicial districts in the country to have Local Patent Rules.

Death
Lancaster died suddenly on April 24, 2013 at his home in Pittsburgh. He was still on the bench and was expected to serve on active status through at least 2014. In announcing his death, the Pittsburgh Tribune-Review heralded him as a judge known for "being able to handle any case." He was succeeded as Chief Judge by Sean J. McLaughlin.

See also 
 List of African-American federal judges
 List of African-American jurists
 List of first minority male lawyers and judges in Pennsylvania

References

Sources

1949 births
2013 deaths
African-American judges
Judges of the United States District Court for the Western District of Pennsylvania
United States district court judges appointed by Bill Clinton
Slippery Rock University of Pennsylvania alumni
University of Pittsburgh School of Law alumni
People from Brownsville, Pennsylvania
United States magistrate judges
20th-century American judges
21st-century American judges